Pluteus lutescens is a mushroom in the Pluteaceae family. A cosmopolitan species often found on decaying wood.

References

lutescens